Rustefjelbma  is a village in Deatnu-Tana Municipality in Troms og Finnmark county, Norway. The village of Bonakas lies just north of Rustefjelbma.

Rustefjelbma is the location of Tana Church. During the winter months, there is an ice road that crosses the Tana River at Rustefjelbma.

Climate
Rustefjelbma has a subarctic climate (Köppen Dfc).

References

Villages in Finnmark
Tana, Norway
Populated places of Arctic Norway